Shut Up Anthony is a 2017 American comedy-drama film directed by Kyle Eaton, starring Robert A. D'Esposito, Jon Titterington and Katie Michels.

Cast
 Robert A. D'Esposito as Anthony
 Jon Titterington as Tim
 Katie Michels as Sam

Reception
Mike Acker of The Oregonian that the film "works for any number of reasons, but mostly it works because the emotions feel real."

Anthony Ray Bench of Film Threat gave the film a score of 6/10 and wrote that while the film has an "interesting" premise, it is "squandered by an unlikable main character and a slow pace."

Curtis Cook of Willamette Week wrote that "while the characters aren't always likable, their awkward misadventures are bound to get a chuckle."

Megan Burbank of Portland Mercury called the film "well-paced and beautifully shot" and wrote that it "holds together as quiet little portrait of despair".

References

External links
 
 

American comedy-drama films
2017 comedy-drama films
2017 films